Monroeville (also, Munroeville), named for its founder U. P. Monroe, was the county seat of Colusa County from 1851 to 1853. The people of the community of Colusa fought for and eventually won the right to become the County Seat in 1853. A post office operated at Monroeville from 1853 to 1862. The area containing Monroeville was eventually absorbed into Glenn County when that county was formed in 1891.

References

Former settlements in Glenn County, California
Former county seats in California
Ghost towns in California
1851 establishments in California